Hooker Creek Airport , also known as Hooker Creek Aerodrome and Lajamanu Airport, is an airport in Lajamanu, Northern Territory, Australia. The airstrip is sealed.

It is serviced by chartered flights, the RAAF and the Flying Doctor service.  the main private operator is Chartair.

See also
 List of airports in the Northern Territory

References

Airports in the Northern Territory